Two highways in the U.S. state of Nevada have been signed as Route 6:
U.S. Route 6 in Nevada
Nevada State Route 6 (1919), which existed until the 1970s renumbering